is a train station in Yao, Osaka Prefecture, Japan.

Lines
Kintetsu Railway
 ■ Nishi-Shigi Cable Line (Z15)

Adjacent stations

Railway stations in Osaka Prefecture
Stations of Kintetsu Railway